Track of the Cat is a 1954 American Western film directed by William A. Wellman and starring Robert Mitchum, Teresa Wright and Diana Lynn. The film is based on a 1949 adventure novel of the same name by Walter Van Tilburg Clark. This was Wellman's second adaptation of a Clark novel; the first was The Ox-Bow Incident in 1943. Track of the Cat was produced by John Wayne and Robert Fellows for their production company Batjac Productions.

Plot
The squabbling Bridges family spends a harsh winter on their remote ranch in Northern California in the early years of the 20th century. Crude and quarrelsome middle brother Curt bullies his noble, unselfish eldest brother Arthur, while youngest brother Harold endures Curt's abuse in browbeaten silence. Their mother is a bigoted religious zealot and their father is a loquacious, self-pitying drunk. Bitter old-maid sister Grace is temporarily gladdened by the arrival of Harold’s fiancée, the spirited Gwen.

The family's hired Indian hand Joe Sam alerts the family to a panther prowling the hills; many years before, his family was wiped out by a panther. Joe Sam’s superstitious dread of the cat irritates the domineering Curt, but Curt and Arthur split up to track the panther while the family tensely awaits their return.  

Gentle Harold tries to avoid conflict with his parents, while Gwen tenderly encourages him to assert his claim to an equal share of the ranch. Harold refuses to demand his share out of respect for Curt, who'd saved the ranch singlehandedly years ago. Although Grace tries to support her youngest brother and his fiancée, Ma Bridges is hatefully suspicious of Gwen, who ignores the family’s histrionics calmly for Harold’s sake.

Arthur and Curt both die in pursuit of the panther, which is ultimately killed by Harold. The surviving characters seem hopeful that their ordeal may have created the basis for a happier future.

Cast
 Robert Mitchum as Curt Bridges
 Teresa Wright as Grace Bridges
 Diana Lynn as Gwen Williams
 Tab Hunter as Harold Bridges
 Beulah Bondi as Ma Bridges
 Philip Tonge as Pa Bridges
 William Hopper as  Arthur Bridges
 Carl Switzer as Joe Sam

Production
The outdoor scenes were filmed on Mount Rainier in Washington and Mitchum regarded shooting in the deep snow and cold as the worst filming conditions he had ever experienced.

Director William A. Wellman had always intended to film a black-and-white movie in color. His idea was that if a film were to be shot in mostly monochromatic shades, with stark blacks and whites and otherwise mostly very subdued colors that were almost shades of grey, he could use bright colors very sparingly for intense dramatic effect. William Clothier's cinematography was designed to highlight black and white and downplay colors. Only key elements such as the blue matches, the fire and Mitchum's red coat stand out.

Reception
Writing in The New York Times, critic Bosley Crowther called the film "a sort of Eugene O'Neill-ized Western drama" and provided a mixed review: "... Mr. Wellman's big-screen picture seems a heavy and clumsy travesty of a deep matriarchal melodrama or a Western with Greek overtones. And the business of the brother hunting the panther in the great big CinemaScope outdoors, while the family booze and blather in the ranch-house, has the nature of an entirely different show ... This, in the last analysis, is the trouble with the film: it has no psychological pattern, no dramatic point. There's a lot of pretty snow scenery in it and a lot of talk about deep emotional things. But it gets lost in following some sort of pretense."

Other contemporary reviews were also mixed despite their acclaim for the film's scenery. The Richmond News Leader called it "gloomy" but a review in The Spokesman-Review categorized Track of the Cat as "another psychological puzzler, but easily one of the best of the year."

More recently, film critic Dennis Schwartz wrote positively about the film in 2005: "A brilliantly realized ambitious dark, brooding Western set in the 1880s in northern California on an isolated snowbound ranch. It is based on the book by Walter van Tilburg Clark, one of whose other books, The Ox-Bow Incident, had also been filmed by William Wellman. The scorching literate script is by A.I. Bezzerides. It has the haunting feel of a Poe work and the primitive savageness of Indian folklore. Cinematographer William H. Clothier bleached out the primary colors and that gave the images the look of a black and white film. The haunting luminous look created was very effective in charging the film with the sub-textual sexual energy that lingers from the hot melodramatics and also giving it an alluring aura of mystery."

References

External links

DVD Reviews
 Track of the Cat film review by Glenn Erickson at DVD Savant
 Track of the Cat film review by Erik Rupp at Vista Records
 Track of the Cat film review by Paul Schultz at The-Trades

1954 Western (genre) films
1954 films
American Western (genre) films
Batjac Productions films
CinemaScope films
Films about brothers
Films about cats
Films about hunters
Films based on American novels
Films based on Western (genre) novels
Films directed by William A. Wellman
Films produced by John Wayne
Films scored by Roy Webb
Films set in California
Films shot in Washington (state)
1950s English-language films
Warner Bros. films
1950s American films